Reginald Dawson Livermore  (born 11 December 1938) is an Australian actor, singer, theatrical performer and former television presenter.

Childhood
From a young age, Livermore demonstrated an interest in the performing arts. Regular outings to see pantomimes at the Tivoli Theatre Sydney indicated the sort of productions he enjoyed, and hinted at the direction his career would eventually take. At the age of 13 he started hiring local halls to stage performances of his own pantomimes in aid of local charities, his casts made up of coerced neighbourhood children and school friends. He hired the Mosman Town Hall in 1955 and again in 1956 to stage Snow White, and then Mother Goose. More money was taken at the box office but profits were small. The young actor-manager began to appreciate the hit and miss nature of show business.

During his last years at school he worked hard at the drama club and worked nights at the Independent Theatre where he’d been attending acting classes, and as the opportunities presented themselves appeared in Toad of the Hall, The Glass Slipper, The Merchant of Venice and A Midsummer Night's Dream; He chose to leave school early. More plays for the Independent followed, and in 1957, after a successful audition for well-known Phillip Street Theatre his professional career was underway.

Early career
He was initially a student of Doris Fitton's at the Independent Theatre in North Sydney. His first professional job was as understudy at the Phillip Theatre in Around The Loop, covering Gordon Chater and Barry Humphries; in the next revue, Cross Section, he starred with Ruth Cracknell, June Salter and John Meillon. During this period he met Hayes Gordon and began acting lessons in earnest, becoming a founding member of the Ensemble Theatre-in-the-round. Like many actors of that time he was drawn to the bright lights of London and then returned to Australia and the Ensemble Theatre, by then re-located to a boatshed at the edge of Sydney Harbour in Kirribilli.

There followed a period of instruction and practical experience with his teacher, Hayes Gordon. Livermore appeared in Ensemble productions of Orpheus Descending, The Drunkard, The Double Dealer, The Canterville Ghost, The Thracian Horses, Miss Lonely Hearts, The Physicists and The Real Inspector Hound. He moved to Melbourne for a two and a half-year stint with the Union Theatre Repertory Company, performing in the works of Rattigan, Ionesco, Shakespeare, Peter Ustinov, Bram Stoker and Patrick White. He also made his directorial debut in a new production of The Shifting Heart by Australian playwright Richard Beynon and wrote his first musical The Good Ship Walter Raleigh. At the conclusion of this very busy period, he returned to Sydney to re-establish his career. He performed in the Independent Theatre production Oh Dad, Poor Dad, Mamma's Hung You in the Closet and I'm Feelin' So Sad with Lyndall Barbour, followed up by The Importance of Being Earnest at the Old Tote Theatre Company with Sophie Stewart and Ron Haddrick.

During the 1960s Livermore became nationally known with roles in a number of notable Australian films and television programs. His first known TV role was in the early Australian TV adventure series Whiplash (1961). He featured in several important ABC television drama productions, playing Ariel in The Tempest (1963), and co-starring opposite Tony Ward in The Rape of the Belt (1964). During 1964–65 he had a featured role as the alien Vorussa in the pioneering ABC-TV children's science fiction series The Stranger. Livermore had a prominent role the groundbreaking Commonwealth Film Unit documentary From the Tropics to the Snow (1964) and also featured in the historic ABC-TV production of The Recruiting Officer (1965), notable as the first play ever performed in the newly founded colony of New South Wales, in 1789. He gained his first starring role in TV as the host of the ABC version of the children's comedy series Crackerjack (1966–67), and was a featured cast member for the final season of the satirical sketch series The Mavis Bramston Show (1968).

Theatre debut
During 1964/65 Livermore starred as the Wicked Witch of the West in the Wizard of Oz at the Sydney Tivoli, and then played the lead role in The Knack for the Phillip Theatre management. He then became the first guest of the newly formed South Australia Theatre Company performing Andorra by Max Frisch and West of the Black Stump which he wrote with Sandra McKenzie. This was followed by the popular, A Cup Of Tea, A Bex and A Good Lie Down another Sydney Phillip Theatre show featuring Gloria Dawn and Ruth Cracknell. After fifteen months in this show, Livermore was invited to compere a children's program for ABCTV called CrackerJack. On the strength of his success the ABC offered Reg his own Saturday night Variety show called I'm Alright Now. Next year he took over from Ronnie Fraser in the Mavis Bramston Show, and when Mavis finished in 1968 stayed on at Channel 7 to participate in Anything Goes.

In 1969 Livermore added to his musical credits in The Mikado. In 1969 he joined the cast of the original Australian production of the then groundbreaking rock musical Hair. He originally joined as a member of "the Tribe", then became the understudy to Keith Glass who played the role of Berger. When Glass left the production in 1970 Livermore took over as Berger, and Hair rapidly elevated his commercial and theatrical profile.

After two years starring in Hair he moved on to The Tooth of Crime by Sam Shepard at Nimrod, his own musical Lasseter for the Old Tote, and then joined the cast of the acclaimed Australian production of Jesus Christ Superstar for Harry M. Miller, where he won rave reviews for his show-stopping performance as King Herod. In 1974 he was rewarded with one of his greatest and best-known roles, Dr Frank’n’Furter in the original Australian production of The Rocky Horror Show, and he also performed the role for the Australian cast recording.

In 1975, at the request of producer Eric Dare, Livermore conceived his first one-man show, Betty Blokk-buster Follies, which played to record crowds in Sydney, Canberra, Perth, Adelaide and Melbourne. He then wrote and performed a string of successful one-man shows – Wonder Woman, Sacred Cow, Son of Betty and Firing Squad.

In December 1977, Livermore's musical Ned Kelly written with composer Patrick Flynn opened in Adelaide, produced by the Adelaide Festival Centre Trust.  Livermore wrote, directed and designed the show but did not perform in it.  The production transferred to Sydney, opening in February 1978 and playing for two months.  An earlier version of the musical received a concept album in 1974.

His trip to London with Sacred Cow in 1980 created an unexpected sensation: the audience tried to boo him off the stage but he refused to oblige them. The Sydney Daily Telegraph subsequently lamented that his appearance in the West End had given Australia a bad name. In 1982 he played the title role in the American musical Barnum, and 1984 saw him in a revival of The Rocky Horror Show directed by another Rocky star Daniel Abineri.

Return to television and theatre 
After this Reg enjoyed a quiet time tending his well-known garden property in the picturesque Blue Mountains, also mounting several exhibitions of his own colourful paintings. In 1989 he returned to television, as a member of Burke's Backyard on the Nine Network, concurrently writing and performing Wish You Were Here, a one-man show at the Clarendon Theatre Restaurant in Katoomba. This subsequently played the Melbourne International Festival and a season at the Victorian Arts Centre. In 1991 he appeared in the Gilbert and Sullivan opera Iolanthe for Victoria State Opera and directed La Traviata for the same organisation at the Ballarat Easter Opera Festival in 1992. In that year he also wrote and performed his second one-man show for the Blue Mountains, Santa on the Planet of the Apes. This was followed by his performance as Major General Stanley in The Pirates of Penzance, again for Victoria State Opera.

During 1993 he toured regional Victoria with Wish You Were Here and in 1994/95 he performed the same play at the Ensemble Theatre in Sydney. He also wrote and performed the highly successful Red Riding Hood, the Speed Hump and the Wolf at the Clarendon and the Ensemble Theatre again, before receiving an Australian Artist Creative Fellowship through the Australia Council. In 1996 Livermore was appointed Officer of the Order of Australia (AO).

Livermore became a regular presenter on Channel Nine's Our House, an infotainment show that notched up nine years of television. In 1998 Livermore wrote and performed Home Sweet Home, Leonard's Last Hurrah for the Clarendon Guest House, followed by a season at the Melbourne Festival, and then at the Sydney Opera House in 1999. In 2001 Reg enjoyed enormous success again at the Clarendon with The Thank You Dinner – A Feast to Remember, and in 2002 joined Opera Australia for their production of Iolanthe at the Sydney Opera House. Livermore starred as The Lord Chancellor in a sell out, three times extended season.

Mid 2003 Livermore auditioned in Los Angeles for Mel Brooks and director Susan Stroman, winning the leading role of Max Bialystock in the new Brooks musical The Producers subsequently playing Melbourne, Sydney and Brisbane to great acclaim. In 2006 Livermore played the Duke of Plaza Toro in the Gilbert and Sullivan Opera The Gondoliers for Opera Australia. 2007 brought a return to The Pirates of Penzance at the State Theatre in Melbourne and The Gondoliers at the Sydney Opera House.

In 2008 Reg took the role of Professor Henry Higgins for Opera Australia's production of My Fair Lady in Melbourne, Sydney, Canberra and Brisbane. Following this appearance and to celebrate the 50th anniversary of the Ensemble Theatre in Sydney, Reg a foundation member of this historical theatre, reprised his entertainment Thank You Dinner, first performed at The Clarendon in Katoomba in 2001.

Reg's autobiography, Chapters and Chances, a coffee table style photographic history, was published in 2003 through Hardie Grant books.

In 2011, Reg toured Australia with Nancye Hayes in his self penned show Turns for Christine Dunstan Productions.

In February 2014, Livermore was signed for the role of The Wizard in the stage show Wicked commencing in May 2014 playing in both Melbourne and Sydney. It was his first stage role for two years. He won a Helpmann Award for the role of The Wizard and in the same year received the Sydney Theatre Awards, Lifetime Achievement Award.

In 2016 won the role of Alfred P. Doolittle in the 60th Anniversary production of My Fair Lady directed by Julie Andrews opening at the Sydney Opera House, touring in 2017 to Brisbane and Melbourne followed by a return season at the Capitol Theater in Sydney. In 2017, Reg was honored with the Helpmann Awards, JC Williamson Centenary Medal from Live Performance Australia.

Personal life
Having lived in Wentworth Falls in The Blue Mountains for over 25 years establishing a prominent garden called Pirramimma, in 2007 Livermore relocated to the Southern Highlands in New South Wales with his long time partner Rob McMicking. In May 2021 Livermore and McMicking married in a small private ceremony at their home in Bowral.

Discography

Albums

Charting singles

Awards and achievements
In a special ceremony at Melbourne's Docklands in 2006, Livermore was named one of 100 Australian Entertainers of the Century.

He received Melbourne's Green Room Award for Male Performer in a Supporting Role in music theatre for The Pirates of Penzance in 1992.

In 2011 an exhibition at Arts Centre Melbourne celebrated Livermore's career, featuring his roles in The Rocky Horror Show, Barnum and The Producers, and his groundbreaking solo shows that began with Betty Blokk-buster Follies. The exhibition displayed stage costumes worn by Livermore and material from his personal archive now held in the Performing Arts Collection.

Helpmann Award
The Helpmann Awards is an awards show, celebrating live entertainment and performing arts in Australia, presented by industry group Live Performance Australia (LPA) since 2001. In 2019, Livermore received the JC Williamson Award, the LPA's highest honour, for their life's work in live performance.

|-
| 2005
| Reg Livermore (for The Producers)
| Helpmann Award for Best Male Actor in a Musical
| 
|-
| 2009
| Reg Livermore (for My Fair Lady)
| Helpmann Award for Best Male Actor in a Musical
| 
|-
| 2014
| Reg Livermore (for Wicked)
| Helpmann Award for Best Male Actor in a Supporting Role in a Musical
| 
|-
| 2018 || Himself || JC Williamson Award || 
|-

Mo Awards
The Australian Entertainment Mo Awards (commonly known informally as the Mo Awards), were annual Australian entertainment industry awards. They recognise achievements in live entertainment in Australia from 1975 to 2016. Reg Livermore won one award in that time.
 (wins only)
|-
| 2004
| Reg Livermore
| Male Musical Theatre Performer of the Year
| 
|-

Sydney Theatre Awards
In 2015, Livermore was the recipient of the Lifetime Achievement Award at the Sydney Theatre Awards.

|-
| 2015 || Himself || Lifetime Achievement Award || 
|-

References

Publications

External links
 Official site

 Reg Livermore Collection at the Performing Arts Collection, Arts Centre Melbourne

1938 births
Living people
Australian television presenters
Australian male stage actors
Australian male television actors
Australian male musical theatre actors
Australian gay actors
Australian gay musicians
Helpmann Award winners
Australian LGBT singers
People educated at Knox Grammar School
Officers of the Order of Australia
People from the Blue Mountains (New South Wales)
Gay singers
Australian musical theatre lyricists
20th-century Australian male singers
20th-century LGBT people
21st-century LGBT people